Roger Howard Samuels (January 5, 1961 – January 17, 2022) was an American professional baseball player who pitched in Major League Baseball from 1988 to 1989 for the San Francisco Giants and Pittsburgh Pirates. He died from cancer on January 17, 2022, at the age of 61.

References

External links 

Baseball Almanac

1961 births
2022 deaths
Major League Baseball pitchers
San Francisco Giants players
Pittsburgh Pirates players
Daytona Beach Astros players
Baseball players from California
Baseball players from San Jose, California
San Jose City Jaguars baseball players
Alaska Goldpanners of Fairbanks players
Asheville Tourists players
Auburn Astros players
Buffalo Bisons (minor league) players
Columbus Astros players
Fresno Giants players
Phoenix Firebirds players
Shreveport Captains players
Tidewater Tides players
Santa Clara Broncos baseball players
Deaths from cancer in California